Nancy 10 is the tenth studio album by Lebanese singer Nancy Ajram. It was released on July 10, 2021, by In2Musica, four years after its predecessor Nancy 9 (2017). Ajram started working on the album in late 2018, after the end of her tour in the United States, the "USA Tour 2018". Originally scheduled to be released during 2020, Ajram postponed the album release to 2021 due to the COVID-19 pandemic.

In order to create this comeback record, Ajram enlisted a variety of writers and producers she previously has collaborated with, including Hadi Sharara, Bassem Rizk, Ziad Bourji, Walid Saad, Mohammed Yehia, Khaled Tag Eldeen, Amir Teima and Ahmad Madi, alongside new collaborations with Hany Yacoub, Ayman Koumayha, Nabil El Khoury, Belal Srour, Ali El Mawla, Shady Nour and Ahmed Erfan.

Promotion and release 
Ajram announced her tenth album in early 2021, starting a hashtag trend #Nancy10 on social media. The songs "Hobbak Bi Ye'wa", "Meshkeltak Alwahidi", "Gayya Maak", and "Baddi Hada Hebbou" were released as promotional singles. Spotify marked the album's release with billboards featuring the album cover in New York City's Times Square.

Singles 
"Salamat" was released on July 23, 2021 as the lead single from Nancy 10. The second single, "Miyye W Khamsin", was released on November 6, 2021.

The music video for the third single, "Ma Te'tezer", was released on March 14, 2022. It shows an abusive relationship and Ajram's attempt at running away. It has accumulated 14 million views in over six months.

"Aala Shanak" was released on October 6, 2022 as the album's fourth single. The music video for the song was directed by Leila Kanaan and has an Indian setting. It accumulated almost two million views in less than two days. The album's fifth single, "Baddi Hada Hebbou", was released on January 26, 2023.

Track listing

Personnel 
 Yara Saad - design
 Elie Barbar - mastering, mixing (tracks 1, 2, 3, 4, 5, 6, 7, 8, 9, 10, 12)
 Ahmad Ibrahim - mixing (track 11)
 Mohammad Sakr - mixing (tracks 13, 14)
 Lara Zankoul - photographer

Release history

Notes

References 

Nancy Ajram albums
2021 albums
Arabic-language albums